André Luiz Castro Teixeira (born April 24, 1974 in Rio de Janeiro) is a former international butterfly and freestyle swimmer from Brazil. He participated in two consecutive Summer Olympics for his native country, starting in 1992. His best result was in Atlanta, Georgia where he came tenth in the men's 4×200-metre freestyle.

At the 1992 Summer Olympics, in Barcelona, Teixeira finished 19th in the 200-metre butterfly.

Teixeira participated at the 1993 FINA World Swimming Championships (25 m), in Palma de Mallorca, where he finished 6th in the 200-metre butterfly, breaking the South American record, with a time of 1:57.06. He also finished 10th in the 100-metre butterfly.

At the 1994 World Aquatics Championships, held in September in Rome, Italy, the Brazilian got the bronze in the 4×100-metre freestyle, and finished 20th in the 100-metre butterfly.

Teixeira swam at the 1995 Pan American Games held in March in Argentina, where he won a silver medal in the 4×100-metre medley, and a bronze medal in the 200-metre butterfly.

At the 1996 Summer Olympics, in Atlanta, Teixeira finished 10th in the 4×200-metre freestyle, and 32nd in the 100-metre butterfly.

References
Profile

1974 births
Living people
Brazilian male butterfly swimmers
Swimmers at the 1992 Summer Olympics
Swimmers at the 1995 Pan American Games
Swimmers at the 1996 Summer Olympics
Olympic swimmers of Brazil
Swimmers from Rio de Janeiro (city)
Brazilian male freestyle swimmers
World Aquatics Championships medalists in swimming
Pan American Games silver medalists for Brazil
Pan American Games bronze medalists for Brazil
Pan American Games medalists in swimming
Medalists at the 1995 Pan American Games
21st-century Brazilian people
20th-century Brazilian people